You Start I'll Join In was a BBC Radio 2 series broadcast between September 1987 and October 1987. It was written by David Bond and Paul Hawksbee, and produced by Pete Atkin.

It starred George Layton as Mac and Vas Blackwood as Trevor. It was a comedy show and told the tale of two musicians playing in a duo as a drummer and a pianist and told of their wacky adventures. It was six episodes approx 30mins each. This show may have been lost forever as the BBC archive no longer has it according to the BBC.

References 
 You Start I,ll Join at EpGuides
 You Start I,ll Join at RadioHaHa

BBC Radio 2 programmes
1987 radio programme debuts